Jintian may refer to:

Jintian, Guangxi (金田), a town in Guiping, Guangxi, China
Jintian Park, a park in Chaoyang District, Beijing, China
Jintian (journal), a Chinese literary journal
Shaohao, also known as Jintian (金天), legendary Chinese sovereign

See also
Jintian Uprising, an 1851 uprising against the Qing dynasty by the Taiping rebels, named after the town